Yiddish grammar is the system of principles which govern the structure of the Yiddish language. This article describes the standard form laid out by YIVO while noting differences in significant dialects such as that of many contemporary Hasidim. As a Germanic language descended from Middle High German, Yiddish grammar is very similar to that of German, though it also has numerous linguistic innovations as well as grammatical features influenced by or borrowed from Hebrew, Aramaic, and various Slavic languages.

Nouns

Gender
Yiddish nouns are classified into one of three grammatical genders: masculine (זכר ), feminine (נקבֿה ) and neuter (נײטראַל ). To a large extent, the gender of a noun is unpredictable, though there are some regular patterns: 
 nouns denoting specifically male humans and animals are usually masculine, and nouns denoting specifically female humans and animals are usually feminine
 nouns ending in an unstressed schwa are usually feminine
 nouns built on most of the common abstract noun suffixes, such as ונג- -ung and הײט- -hayt, are feminine
 diminutive nouns with the suffix -l are neuter in the standard language
 loanwords are generally assigned masculine gender by default unless they end in a schwa, in which case they are usually feminine.
Gender assignment for new words and sporadic realignments of older ones are examples of the dynamic tendency observable for nouns that do not reflect an inherent sex. It designates nouns with vowel endings as feminine and those with consonant endings as masculine.

Case
There are three grammatical cases in Yiddish: nominative, accusative and dative. The nominative case generally is used for the subject, the accusative for the direct object and the dative for an indirect object or object of a preposition. Nouns are normally not inflected for case, and case is indicated by the inflection of a related definite article or adjective. However, a handful of nouns do have inflectional endings to indicate the accusative and/or dative cases, which may be optional or obligatory, depending on the specific lexical item and dialect; examples of nouns that take obligatory case endings include certain kinship terms (טאַטע tate 'father', מאַמע mame 'mother') and the words ייִד yid 'Jew' and האַרץ harts 'heart'. In those cases, masculine nouns take the ending ן- -n in the accusative and dative singular, i.e. טאַטן tatn 'father', רבין rebn 'rabbi' or 'teacher'; feminine and neuter nouns take ן- -n only in the dative singular, where, for example, מאַמע mame becomes מאַמען mamen.

Yiddish does not have a genitive case. However, when the possessor is a human or occasionally other living beings, possession may be indicated with a suffixed ס- -s (like English possessive -'s). Otherwise, possession is normally indicated by the preposition פֿון fun 'of'.

Another genitive-like construction, the quantitative, is used to describe quantities of objects:   (a full cup of hot tea);   (a group of young people). The noun phrase representing the quantity is simply followed by noun representing the object described. This construction may not be used if the object has a definite article:   (a full cup of the hot tea).

Plural
There are two regular plural suffixes. For nouns ending in an unstressed vowel, the plural is regularly formed with the suffix -s; e.g., the plural of גרופּע grupe 'group' is גרופּעס grupes. For nouns ending in a consonant, the plural is regularly formed with -n; the plural of טיש tish 'table' is טישן tishn.

A very large number of nouns use irregular plural forms, including -es (these are usually nouns of Slavic origin), and -er with umlaut (e.g., מאַן man 'man' → מענער mener 'men'; קינד kind 'child' → קינדער kinder 'children'), or umlaut alone (e.g., האַנט hant 'hand' → הענט hent 'hands'). Some words do not change in the plural (e.g., פֿיש fish 'fish'). Nouns built on the diminutive suffixes -l and -ele form the plural in -ekh (e.g., מײדל meydl 'girl' → מײדלעך meydlekh 'girls').

Most words of Hebrew origin use the Hebrew plural suffixes, either -im (e.g., ספֿר seyfer 'holy book' → ספֿרים sforim 'holy books') or -es (e.g., סוד sod 'secret' → סודות soydes 'secrets'). As these examples show, many plurals of Hebrew origin involve stem mutation in addition to the suffix, as in the original Hebrew. Not all words of Hebrew origin form their plurals in the same way they do in Hebrew: in particular, Hebrew feminine nouns ending in  tend to become masculine in Yiddish, and take the -im plural suffix, avoiding the uneuphonic ending *-ses: e.g. שבת shabes 'sabbath' → Hebrew שבתות shaboses, Yiddish שבתים‎ shabosim. This tendency extends also to cases when the Hebrew plural ends in -yes rather than -ses: e.g. תּכלית takhles 'purpose' → Hebrew תּכליות takhliyes, Yiddish תּכליתים takhleysim. Other words of Hebrew origin form a Germanic plural, e.g., קול kol 'voice' has the plural קולער keler, formed with the Germanic -er suffix and umlaut. Finally, there are a few words of non-Hebrew origin that take Hebrew plural suffixes, such as דאָקטער dokter 'doctor' → דאָקטוירים doktoyrim, פּויער poyer 'farmer' → פּויערים‎ poyerim.

Articles
The definite article agrees in gender, number and case with the noun it is used with.

The indefinite article is אַ a, which becomes אַן an before a word beginning with a vowel sound. Yiddish, like English, does not have a plural indefinite article.

Adjectives
Attributive adjectives—that is, those that directly modify a noun—are inflected to agree with the gender, number and case of the noun they modify, while predicate adjectives remain uninflected. For example, one says דער גוטער מאַן der guter man 'the good man', but דער מאַן איז גוט Der man iz gut 'The man is good'. When an adjective is used absolutively—that is, to stand as the head of a noun phrase as if it were itself a noun—it is inflected as if it were followed by a noun: דער מאַן איז אַ גוטער Der man iz a guter 'The man is a good [one]'. Neuter singular adjectives are in some respects exceptional; in attributive position, they have no case ending unless their noun phrase is introduced by the definite article; in absolutive position, they use the distinctive suffix -s in the nominative and accusative cases.

The ending -n becomes -en after an m, or a stressed vowel or diphthong; it becomes -em after n and, as an exception, in the adjective nay (new). Yiddish is slightly simpler than German in that German -m and -n are both -n in Yiddish (or, in the case of the definite article, dem), and Yiddish does not have a genitive case. The "definite" and "absolutive" versions of the neuter gender are a relic of the strong vs. weak adjective endings of German (das gute Bier vs. gutes Bier).

A class of pronominal adjectives, including אײן eyn 'one', קײן keyn 'none', and possessive pronouns such as מײַן mayn 'my, mine' and זײַן zayn 'his', display behavior opposite to that of ordinary adjectives: they are inflected for gender, number and case when used predicatively but not when used attributively. (Absolutively, they behave as normal adjectives).

Adjectives normally precede the nouns, but they may follow the nouns as an absolutive construction for stylistic purposes: אַ שיינע פֿרוי a sheyne froy or אַ פֿרוי אַ שיינע a froy a sheyne ('a beautiful woman').

Pronouns

Third person pronouns agree in gender with the noun they refer to. Thus even inanimate objects are sometimes referred to as er or zi if they are masculine or feminine respectively. Neuter nouns receive es.

Younger people typically use the second person singular pronoun forms.

The dative forms of the single personal pronouns are used by a minority of speakers of the Northeastern dialect of Yiddish.

Verbs

Verb inflection
Yiddish verbs are conjugated for person (first, second, and third) and number (singular and plural) in the present tense. In the imperative, they conjugate only for number. Nonfinite verb forms are the infinitive and the past participle.

The infinitive of a verb is formed with the suffix  ן- -n (which takes the form ען- -en in certain phonological contexts). The imperative uses the base form of the verb with no affixes in the singular, and takes the suffix ט- -t in the plural. In the present tense, the first-person singular takes the base form of the verb; the other person/number combinations are regularly inflected according to the following table:

A present participle, functioning as a derived adjective or adverb, is regularly constructed by adding the suffix דיק- -dik to the infinitive.

Past participle
The past participle is used extensively in Yiddish. The majority of verbs (weak verbs) form the past participle by adding the prefix -גע ge- and the suffix ט- -t to the stem, e.g. געקויפֿט  'bought'. However, strong verbs form the past participle with -גע ge- and ן- -n, usually accompanied by a vowel change, e. g. געהאָלפֿן  'helped' from the stem -העלפֿ helf- 'help'. The vowel change is unpredictable, and there is no way to tell from the infinitive whether a verb is weak or strong.

The prefix -גע ge- is omitted in past participles of verbs whose first syllable does not bear primary stress. There are two classes of verbs for which this happens: verbs with one of several unstressed stem prefixes, such as -פֿאַר far- or -באַ ba-; and verbs built on the stressed suffix יר- -ir, usually used for loanwords. Thus the past participles of פֿאַרקויפֿן farkoyfn 'to sell' and אַבאָנירן  'to subscribe' are, respectively, merely פֿאַרקויפֿט  and אַבאָנירט .

Some participles vary between dialects and registers; for example, געווען  is the usual past participle of זיַין  'be', but געוועזן  (normally an adjective meaning 'former') may be used as the past participle in a "Daytshmerish" (Standard German–imitating) register.

Examples of conjugation

The table below shows the inflection of various Yiddish verbs. Most verbs are generally regular, with irregularities occurring predominantly in the past participle.

The following table shows some additional irregular past participles:

Separable verbs
Like German, Yiddish has a family of separable verbs. These are verb stems co-occurring with a particle that sometimes occurs as a prefix attached to the verb stem and sometimes as a separate word. The particle appears separate from the verb in the present tense, but is attached as a prefix in the infinitive and participle. For example, in אויסזאָגן  'to reveal', the particle אויס oys is attached to the verb; but in the present tense זאָגט אויס  'reveals', the particle appears as a separate word. In the past participle, the particle appears before the prefix ge-, as in אויסגעזאָגט  'revealed'.

The same grammatical structure of separable verbs is used for a class called "periphrastic verbs". In these, the uninflected particle, often a loanword from Hebrew, carries the main meaning, and it is accompanied by an inflected light verb. For example, in תּשובֿה טאָן  'repent', the word תּשובֿה tshuve is a Hebrew loanword meaning 'repentance', acting grammatically as a particle accompanying the verb טאָן ton 'do'.

The periphrastic-verb construction mechanism allows Yiddish to borrow many Hebrew verbs and verbal constructions. Present-participle forms of active Hebrew verbs are used as particles accompanying the light verb זײַן (zayn 'be'), while present participles of passive Hebrew verbs accompany the light verb ווערן (vern 'become'):

מסכּים זײַן ( 'to agree')
קונה־שם זײַן ( 'to gain popularity')
נעלם ווערן ( 'to disappear')
זיך נתגלגל ווערן ( 'to reincarnate')

Hence the word for "to be impressed" is נתפּעל ווערן nispoel vern, as opposed to מתפּעל ווערן as a Modern Hebrew speaker might expect.

Auxilary-verb constructions
Like other varieties of High German and unlike literary German, Yiddish does not have the inflected past tense (preterite). Instead, the auxiliary verbs האָבן hobn 'to have' or זײַן zayn 'to be' are used with the past participle of the verb to construct the past tense. Most verbs take האָבן hobn; for example, the past tense of איך קויף  'I buy' is איך האָב געקויפֿט  'I bought'. About 30 intransitive verbs of motion or status and some of their derivatives take זײַן zayn; e.g., the past tense of איך קום ikh kum 'I come' is איך בין געקומען  'I came'. Transitive derivatives of these exceptional verbs usually take  האָבן hobn: e.g., זײַן zayn is used with the intransitive גײן geyn 'go', but האָבן hobn is used with the derived transitive separable verb איבערגײן  'go across'.

The future tense in Yiddish is formed with a special auxiliary verb וועלן  followed by the infinitive. As shown in the table above, its inflection is irregular.

The pluperfect is formed by adding the modifier געהאַט  (the past participle of האָבן hobn 'have') to the past tense: איך האָב געהאַט געזאָגט  ('I had said'); איר זענט געהאַט געגאַנגען  (you had gone). The Future perfect tense is formed with the future tense auxiliary followed by the auxiliary verb האָבן and the participle of the verb: איך וועל האָבן געזאָגט  (I will have said). These tenses are both very infrequent, especially in the spoken language. When the context makes the previousness of action clear, the ordinary past or future is used instead, and usually with an adverb such as שוין  (already) or פֿריִער  (earlier).

The auxiliary verb פֿלעגן, in combination with the infinitive (or participle, in some dialects), is used to form a habitual past aspect: for example, איך פֿלעג קומען ikh fleg kumen (I used to come).

The auxiliary וואָלט, accompanying the past participle, is used to form a conditional mood: איך וואָלט געגאַנגען  'I would have gone'.

Other aspectual constructions

A "momental" aspect, expressing a one-time action, may be formed by the light verbs טאָן (ton, 'do') or געבן ('give') followed by an indefinite article and a verbal noun, similar to such English expressions as 'have a look'. The verbal noun may be modified by adjectives, as in 'have a good look' in English. The form with געבן is more emphatic and requires the dative for the verbal noun. If the verb is separable, the particle usually stands between the auxiliary and the noun.

Unlike English, such forms in Yiddish are highly systematic and may be used with virtually any verb. The nouns used sometimes appear only in the context of the verbal aspect. For example, אַ שרײַב געבן , meaning 'hurriedly or suddenly write', contains a noun שרײַב  which would not normally be used independently, and which may be translated as 'an act of writing'.

Examples: זי האָט אים געטאָן אַ כאַפּ אָן  ('she gave him a grab on'); מיר גיבן אַ שרײַ אויס  ('we give a scream out').

The perfective aspect—indicating a completed action in the past or one whose completion is contemplated in the future—can be formed by adding a prefix or separable particle to many verbs. For example, the verb לייענען  'read' may be made perfective with the separable particle איבער  or דורך . Thus איך האָב געלייענט  means 'I read', 'I was reading'; while איך האָב איבערגעלייענט or איך האָב דורכגעלייענט  means 'I read entirely', 'I read through'. Further examples:
 ער וועט שרײַבן  'he will write', 'he will do some writing' ער וועט אָנשרײַבן  'he will write completely', 'he will write up', 'he will get (something) written'
 מיר לערנען זיך פֿראַנצייזיש  'we are studying French', 'we are taking French' מיר ווילן זיך אויסלערנען פֿראַנצייזיש  'we want to learn French thoroughly'

The most common perfectivizing elements are the particles דורך ,איבער ,אָן ,אָפּ ,אויס (oys, op, on) and the prefixes דער־ and צו־ (der-, tsu-), but there are no definitive rules for determining which of these are used with which verbs.

Various other aspects, generally paralleling the complex aspect system of the Slavic languages, are formed by auxiliary verbs or prefixes, sometimes combined with the reflexive particle זיך. Different aspects may be combined, if the logic of the sentence allows for it. Examples: איך פֿלעג געבן אַ שרײַב אָן  (I used to suddenly start and complete writing); זיי נעמען זיך צעלאַכן  (they start bursting into laughter).

Negation

The negators are ניט nit and נישט nisht, which are only stressed when the emphasis is required.

Under the scope of negation, indefinite noun phrases, singular or plural, use the negative article קײן  instead of the indefinite article אַ a or אַן an. Definite noun phrases under negation use the definite article as usual.

Yiddish allows and often requires double negation: קיינער איז דאָרטן נישט געווען  (literally: 'No one was not there') or איך האָב קיינעם נישט געזען  (literally: 'I didn't see no one'). In colloquial speech even triple and multiple negations may occasionally be used: איך האָב נישט געוווּסט קיין גאָרנישט נישט  (literally: 'I did not know no nothing not').

Diminutive and emphatic forms
Yiddish is rich in various emphatic and emotional forms, including several general diminutive, affectionate and emphatic suffixes may be added to Yiddish nouns and adjectives. Many other emotional suffixes are mainly used for personal names and for particular classes of nouns. Emphatic expression are also formed by reduplication of verbs, composite adjectives, various 'mood' particles and interjections.

Yiddish has two diminutive degrees. The first degree is the regular diminutive. The second degree is a stronger, more affectionate diminutive. The second degree is also known as the iminutive.

In order to form any diminutive, there sometimes needs to be a vowel shift (i-mutation/ i-umlaut).  

There are certain instances where only the plural can get any diminutive.

קינדער, kinder (children) → קינדערלעך, kinderlekh (children, diminutive).

Besides the addition of -el and -ele, there are more ways to make a word be in the diminutive. One way is by adding the ending טשיק-, or the Polish -czyk.

יונגערמאַן, yingerman (young man) → יונגערמאַנטשיק, yingermanchik.

Numerals

Cardinal numbers

Ordinal numbers 
The ordinals are adjectives, and as such are inflected to agree with the nouns they modify. For example: 'the first lady' is די ערשטע דאַמע (di ershte dame: since דאַמע dame 'lady' is feminine, the ordinal ערשט ersht takes the suffix -e to agree with it.

Syntax 
Like most Germanic languages, Yiddish generally follows the V2 word order: the second constituent of any clause is a finite verb, regardless of whether the first constituent is the subject, an adverb, or another topicalized element. The V2 grammar of Yiddish differs from that of German and other closely related languages, however: Yiddish uses V2 word order in subordinate clauses as well as main clauses, while in German only main clauses exhibit V2.

However, verb-initial word order may be used to indicate a causal or other close contextual relationship between consecutive sentences, with a meaning similar to English so.

It is customary to use freer word order in Yiddish poetry.

Clitics
Optional contractions are commonly used in both spoken and literary Yiddish. Some auxiliary verbs and personal pronouns are often contracted, especially in colloquial speech. For example, the phrase ער האָט מיר געזאָגט  (he told me) may be contracted to ער׳ט מיר געזאָגט  or ר׳האָט מיר געזאָגט  with the auxiliary almost disappearing, while זאָלן מיר אים דערציילן דאָס געהיימע וואָרט  (let's tell him the secret word) may be contracted to זאָל׳מיר׳ן דערציילן ס׳געהיימע וואָרט . The last phrase is more characteristic for the Central (Polish) dialect.

Dialectal differences

The Northern or so-called Lithuanian dialect of Yiddish from the Baltic countries and Belarus is notable, among a number of other peculiarities, for its lack of the neuter gender and the simplified case system. Substantives which are neuter in standard literary Yiddish appear as masculine or feminine. Only two cases, nominative and accusative or oblique, exist in the Northern Yiddish, except for a few isolated remnants of the dative. The auxiliary verb האָבן  ('to have') may be used with any verb in the Northern Yiddish, including the cases when the literary Yiddish and other dialects require זײַן  ('to be').

Other primary differences between the dialects are in the stressed vowels within the dialect, the differences in their morphology and grammar as well as the northern dialects are more conservative as mentioned above while southern dialects have preserved vowel distinctions.

The realization of stressed vowels is where the main phonetic distinctions across the different dialects are found. Long and short vowels are not separated in Yiddish. Stressed vowels are about the same length. Compared to their English equivalents, they are located closer to the peripheral locations of the cardinal vowels in the vocal tract.

Contemporary Hasidic Yiddish

Spoken Yiddish within contemporary Hasidic communities has seen the emergence of a new set of demonstrative determiners, de, deys, and deye. Deye (determiner) and deys (pronoun) are both used in the singular. They roughly correspond to the English word ‘This’.  For example, one may hear deye yingl iz groys 'This boy is big', but for the pronoun form it would be Deys iz groys 'This is big'. Deys, like dos (from which it is likely derived, and blended with di) when functioning as a pronoun, is used only for non-human subject nouns. Finally, deye 'these' is used for plural and can also function as a pronoun. Curiously, dey, deys, and deye do not appear in Hasidic Yiddish in written form, reflecting the wide divergence between spoken and written forms among Hasidic Yiddish speakers.

A common belief, especially among non-native or academically-trained Yiddish speakers, is that the case and gender system is disappearing from Hasidic Yiddish, though this has been found to be a misapprehension.

In casual usage of Hasidic Yiddish, especially in spoken form, the definite articles der, di, and dos often appear to have shifted to a more general single definite article de in the nominative, accusative, and dative cases, for both singular and plural, complemented by the demonstrative determiners de, deys, and deye.

However, more recent studies of Hasidic Yiddish publications show that a definite case and gender system exists in written Hasidic Yiddish, albeit in a modified, and in some cases, more relaxed, form. Der is widely used for masculine nouns, but never for feminine, even as the use of di has crept beyond the feminine and the plural. In the accusative and dative cases, Hasidic Yiddish uses the definite article dem and its corresponding inflected nouns for the masculine case, and, to a lesser degree, to the dative feminine, where applicable. However, the usage of der for the accusative feminine is more relaxed, and is often replaced by di.

On the whole, written Hasidic Yiddish appears largely dependent on an individual writer's knowledge of Yiddish grammar and specific editorial style guides. More established publications, such as Der Yid, Di Tzeitung, and Maales adhere to the case and gender system more closely (as, in the case of the first two, is reflected in their publication names). The same is true for much of what published in Israel, such as the works of the popular children's book author Menachem Mendel. Dos Yiddishe Vort, published for many decades by Agudath Israel of America until 2013 and whose many issues are still widely read in Hasidic communities, adhered meticulously to the usual standards, as did the Jerusalem-based Dos Yiddishe Licht, and its present incarnation, Balaychtungen. Maales, in particular, has since its inception in the 1990s placed strong emphasis on standards and consistency for both grammar and orthography.

Newer Hasidic Yiddish publications show greater variance among their writers, some of whom show adherence to standard Yiddish orthographic styles and conventions, while others do not, suggesting that editorial guidelines focus largely on content and article structure, and don't have strong style preferences. This is seen not only for case and gender, but also on matters of spelling, punctuation, and the use and styling of English words in transliteration.

A more accurate observation is that Hasidic communities show less concern for grammatical rules — neither for Yiddish nor for the widely-used scholastic Hebrew (nor, for that matter, for English). This could be due to a vestigial aversion to the study of grammar, or dikduk, within ordinary educational curricula, originally a reaction to the 19th century Haskalah, or Jewish Enlightenment, which sought to increase grammatical knowledge and standards for both Yiddish and Hebrew. Another possible cause for grammatical standards that differ somewhat from conventional academic Yiddish is the tendency among Hasidim towards autodidactism in adulthood, as the educational emphasis for children and adolescents is largely on religious studies, especially for boys, who tend to be more Yiddish-speaking than girls. Despite these, however, Hasidic Yiddish is nonetheless still highly standardized, suggesting that standards are learned as first principles directly from the language as it is used, and simply lack deference to standards-creating institutions who have ignored more nuanced linguistic developments in post-World War II Yiddish-speaking communities.

References

Bibliography
Jacobs, Neil G. Yiddish: a Linguistic Introduction, Cambridge University Press, Cambridge, 2005, .
Katz, Dovid, Grammar of the Yiddish Language, Duckworth, London, 1987, .
http://www.dovidkatz.net/dovid/PDFLinguistics/2-1987-Grammar-Yiddish.pdf Grammar of the Yiddish Language by Dovid Katz
Mark, Yudl, A Grammar of Standard Yiddish, CYCO, New York, 1978 (in Yiddish).
Schaechter, Mordkhe, Yiddish Two, League for Yiddish, Inc., New York, 1993.
Weinreich, Uriel. 1971. College Yiddish. New York: YIVO Institute for Jewish Research.
Zucker, S. 1994–2003. Yiddish: An Introduction to the Language, Literature and Culture 1–2. New York: Workmen's Circle.

grammar
West Germanic grammars